Sayantika Banerjee is an Indian actress who is known for her work in Bengali cinema. She has been praised by the critics for her acting and dance skills. In 2012 she was in the Bengali film Awara, which was commercially successful. She joined Trinamool Congress (TMC), ahead of Assembly elections 2021 in West Bengal.

Career 
Banerjee started her career with the dancing reality show Naach Doom Macha Ley. Then she worked in films such as Target, Hangover and Mone Pore Ajo Sei Din, which did not do well at the box office. In 2012, she acted in Awara with Jeet, which got commercial success at the box office. In 2012, she acted in another film; Shooter. In the review of the film, The Times of India wrote:

"The film totally reeks of that age-old concept which certainly doesn't work anymore. Moreover, the lack of hero-like qualities in Joy (who played the lead protagonist Dibya aka Deba), poor dialogues and ample amount of vulgarity and unnecessary violence made it worse. Sayantika as Meghna showed some potential."

Television

Brand Ambassador

Awards and nominations

Filmography

References

External links 
 

Living people
Actresses from Kolkata
Bengali actresses
Actresses in Bengali cinema
Bengali television actresses
Indian television actresses
Indian film actresses
Politicians from Kolkata
West Bengal politicians
Trinamool Congress politicians from West Bengal
Women in West Bengal politics
Indian actor-politicians
21st-century Indian actresses
21st-century Indian women politicians
Year of birth missing (living people)